Hartley is a census-designated place (CDP) in Solano County, California. The 2010 United States census reported Hartley's population was 2,510.

Geography
According to the United States Census Bureau, the CDP covers an area of 6.5 square miles (16.8 km2), 99.57% of it land and 0.43% of it water.

Climate
According to the Köppen Climate Classification system, Hartley has a warm-summer Mediterranean climate, abbreviated "Csa" on climate maps.

Demographics

The 2010 United States Census reported that Hartley had a population of 2,510. The racial makeup of Hartley was 1,956 (77.9%) White, 70 (2.8%) African American, 24 (1.0%) Native American, 70 (2.8%) Asian, 16 (0.6%) Pacific Islander, 248 (9.9%) from other races, and 126 (5.0%) from two or more races. Hispanic or Latino of any race were 510 persons (20.3%).

The Census reported that 2,499 people (99.6% of the population) lived in households, 5 (0.2%) lived in non-institutionalized group quarters, and 6 (0.2%) were institutionalized.

There were 870 households, out of which 271 (31.1%) had children under the age of 18 living in them, 559 (64.3%) were opposite-sex married couples living together, 63 (7.2%) had a female householder with no husband present, 43 (4.9%) had a male householder with no wife present.  There were 40 (4.6%) unmarried opposite-sex partnerships, and 11 (1.3%) same-sex married couples or partnerships. 159 households (18.3%) were made up of individuals, and 54 (6.2%) had someone living alone who was 65 years of age or older. The average household size was 2.87.  There were 665 families (76.4% of all households); the average family size was 3.23.

The population was spread out, with 541 people (21.6%) under the age of 18, 192 people (7.6%) aged 18 to 24, 530 people (21.1%) aged 25 to 44, 876 people (34.9%) aged 45 to 64, and 371 people (14.8%) who were 65 years of age or older.  The median age was 44.8 years. For every 100 females, there were 102.7 males.  For every 100 females age 18 and over, there were 103.6 males.

The homeowner vacancy rate was 1.4%; the rental vacancy rate was 6.0%. 80.6% of the population lived in owner-occupied housing units and 18.9% lived in rental housing units.

References

Census-designated places in Solano County, California
Census-designated places in California